The Song Is Ended is a 1930 German romantic musical film directed by Géza von Bolváry, and starring Liane Haid, Willi Forst, and Margarete Schlegel. A separate French-language version Petit officier... Adieu! was also produced.

The film's sets were designed by the art directors Robert Neppach and Erwin Scharf. It was shot at the Tempelhof Studios in Berlin.

Cast

See also
The Song You Gave Me (1933)

References

External links

1930s romantic musical films
German romantic musical films
Films of the Weimar Republic
Films directed by Géza von Bolváry
German multilingual films
Films shot at Tempelhof Studios
German black-and-white films
1930 multilingual films
Films scored by Robert Stolz
1930s German films